The 1968–69 season was the 89th season of competitive football in England.

Honours

Notes = Number in parentheses is the times that club has won that honour.

FA Cup

Manchester City completed a disappointing season for relegated Leicester City by defeating them 1–0 in the FA Cup Final. Neil Young scored the only goal of the game, although Leicester's David Nish gained the record as the youngest captain of a cup finalist at the age of 21.

The season's big giant-killers were Third Division Mansfield Town who accounted for Sheffield United in the Third Round and West Ham in the Fifth before going out to Leicester in the Sixth Round.

League Cup

In one of the biggest shocks in the history of the competition Swindon Town won the final 3–1 against Arsenal. Swindon's non-top flight status saw them barred from competing in the Inter-Cities Fairs Cup which led to the creation of the Anglo-Italian Cup the following season.

European football
Newcastle United won the first, and to date only, European trophy in their history by beating Újpest of Hungary 6–2 on aggregate to lift the Inter-Cities Fairs Cup.

Football League

First Division
Leeds United won the League for the first time in their history, finishing six points ahead of Liverpool.

Manchester United's final season under the management of Sir Matt Busby before his retirement ended in an 11th-place finish, although their defence of the European Cup lasted until the semi-finals. Their cross city rivals finished 13th a year after being league champions, but had an FA Cup triumph as compensation for their failed defence of the league title and their failure to succeed in the European Cup.

Newly promoted Queens Park Rangers were relegated after finishing bottom, along with the FA Cup runners-up Leicester City.

Second Division
Derby County were runaway winners of the Second Division and they were joined in being promoted by runners-up Crystal Palace. Despite still boasting the talents of Johnny Haynes and George Cohen, Fulham finished bottom and were relegated. They were joined in the Third Division by perennial strugglers Bury

Third Division
Watford won the title on goal average (Goal Ratio) from Swindon Town and both teams were duly promoted. At the bottom end Northampton Town, Hartlepool, Crewe Alexandra and Oldham Athletic were all relegated.

Fourth Division
The Division was won by Doncaster Rovers, who were promoted along with Halifax Town, Rochdale and Bradford City. No team failed re-election so no new members were admitted to the Football League.

Top goalscorers

First Division
Jimmy Greaves (Tottenham Hotspur) – 27 goals

Second Division
John Toshack (Cardiff City) – 22 goals

Third Division
Don Rogers (Swindon Town) – 22 goals

Fourth Division
Gary Talbot (Chester) – 22 goals

Events of the season
 3 August 1968 – The reigning champions Manchester City beat the FA Cup holders West Bromwich Albion 6–1 in the Charity Shield at Maine Road. Bobby Owen and Francis Lee both score twice.
 10 August 1968 – The League season begins with Manchester City losing 2–1 to Liverpool at Anfield. Promoted Queens Park Rangers draw their first match in the First Division at home to Leicester City, and Arsenal win the North London derby 2–1 at White Hart Lane.
 17 August 1968 – The Manchester derby at Maine Road finishes goalless. Draws for West Ham United and Arsenal (against Nottingham Forest and Liverpool respectively) end their 100% records, leaving Leeds United as the only First Division club with six points out of six. Crystal Palace and Millwall are the teams with maximum points in Division Two, while Mansfield Town and Lincoln City, of Divisions Three and Four respectively, have won both of their games thus far.
 19 October 1968 – Geoff Hurst scores six times as West Ham United thrash Sunderland 8–0 to equal their record League victory. Burnley beat Leeds United 5–1.
 18 December 1968 – Tommy Docherty becomes the manager at Aston Villa, his third club in six weeks, after his resignation from Rotherham United and a brief spell at Queens Park Rangers. 
 21 December 1968 – Liverpool beat Tottenham Hotspur 1–0 to top the First Division table at Christmas. Leeds United, who avenge their earlier defeat to Burnley by beating the Clarets 6–1 at Elland Road, are three points behind with two games in hand, while Everton and Arsenal remain in contention. At the bottom, Queens Park Rangers and Coventry City occupy the relegation places.
 14 January 1969 – Sir Matt Busby announces that he will retire as the manager of Manchester United at the end of the season.
 20 January 1969 – Brian Purcell and Roy Evans, two Hereford United players, are killed in a car crash on their way to an FA Cup tie at Nuneaton Borough.
 15 March 1969 – Third Division Swindon Town cause a major shock by beating Arsenal 3–1 in the League Cup final thanks to two goals in extra-time from Don Rogers.
 19 March 1969 – Struggling Manchester United beat bottom-of-the-table Queens Park Rangers 8–1 at Old Trafford in one of the highest-scoring matches of the First Division season.
 29 March 1969 – Queens Park Rangers lose 2–1 at home to Liverpool and are relegated from the First Division in their first season after promotion, having won just three of their 38 matches so far.
 11 April 1969 – The Football Writers' Association Footballer of the Year award is shared for the first time in the 21 years the accolade has existed: Manchester City's Tony Book and Dave Mackay of Derby County are the joint-winners. Leeds' Billy Bremner finishes third, and Jimmy Greaves of Tottenham is fourth.
 26 April 1969 – Manchester City win the FA Cup with a Neil Young goal giving them a 1–0 win over relegation-threatened Leicester City in the Wembley final.
 28 April 1969 – Leeds United draw 0–0 with second-placed Liverpool at Anfield to clinch the First Division title for the first time in their history.
 15 May 1969 – Manchester United's defence of the European Cup ends when they are knocked out by Milan in the semi-finals. They win the second leg at Old Trafford 1–0 with a goal by Bobby Charlton, but lose 2–1 on aggregate. Milan's goalkeeper Fabio Cudicini is injured by an object thrown from the crowd.
 17 May 1969 – Three weeks after their FA Cup final defeat, Leicester City are relegated from the First Division. Needing to beat Manchester United to overtake Coventry City, they lose 3–2 in Matt Busby's last match as Manchester United's manager. Liverpool's draw with Newcastle United leaves them in second place, six points behind Leeds United, who finish the season with just two defeats and unbeaten in their last 28 League games since October.
 11 June 1969 – Newcastle United beat Újpest Dózsa 3–2 in the second leg of the Inter-Cities Fairs Cup Final to secure a 6–2 aggregate victory and win their first European trophy.

Star players
For the only time in its history the Football Writers' Association Footballer of the Year was shared by two players — Tony Book of Manchester City and Dave Mackay of Derby County. For the sixth and final time in his illustrious career Tottenham Hotspur's Jimmy Greaves was Division One top-scorer with 27 goals. He was also top-scorer in the league overall with 22 goals taking the Second Division award for John Toshack of Cardiff City,

Star managers
Don Revie led Leeds United to their first ever League win, with a record number of points, losing just two matches and set in place a team that was to become one of the most successful of the late 1960s and early 1970s.
Already a club legend as a player, Joe Harvey became one of Newcastle United's most celebrated managers by leading the club to European glory.
Ken Furphy took Watford into the Second Division after a close race with Swindon Town. However Swindon's Danny Williams also won the League Cup to make his own name.

National team
The England national football team enjoyed a successful year in the build-up to the 1970 FIFA World Cup, for which they had automatically qualified as holders of the trophy after the 1966 FIFA World Cup. They won the 1969 British Home Championship by beating all three opponents and only lost one game all year, to Brazil during an end of season tour to the Americas.

American tour

Deaths
 5 October 1968 – Joe Brough, 81.
 8 October 1968 – Frank Womack, 80.
 14 October 1968 – Paul Shardlow, 25, heart attack.
 October 1968 – Eric Sweeney, 65
 December 1968 – Brian Hill, 31.
 20 January 1969, Brian Purcell, 30, and Roy Evans, 25, car accident.
 21 January 1969, Len Andrews, 80.
 April 1969, Harry Nuttall, 71
 13 July 1969, Bobby Barclay, 62

References